Lefortovo Prison is a prison in Moscow, Russia which has been under the jurisdiction of the Russian Ministry of Justice since 2005. The prison was built in 1881 in the Lefortovo District of Moscow, named after Franz Lefort, a close associate of Tsar Peter I the Great.

In the Soviet Union, during Joseph Stalin's 1936-38 Great Purge, Lefortovo Prison was used by the NKVD secret police for mass executions and interrogational torture. Lefortovo was an infamous KGB prison and interrogation site (called an "investigative isolator", or СИЗО: следственный изолятор) for political prisoners. In 1994, the prison was transferred to the MVD; from 1996 to 2005, it was under the jurisdiction of the FSB, a KGB successor agency. The prison is said to have strict detention conditions. Only visits by lawyers are allowed. Letters can be received but are read by prison officials.

Notable prisoners

 Several members of the 1991 Soviet coup d'état attempt
 Several members of the Black October 1993 rebellion, including Ruslan Khasbulatov and Alexander Rutskoi
 Igor Artimovich
 Sergey Beseda, former head of the Fifth Service under President Putin until the 2022 invasion of Ukraine; reportedly imprisoned over intelligence failures and embezzlement.  
 Frode Berg, Norwegian spy
 Vasily Blyukher
 Vladimir Bukovsky
 Nicholas Daniloff
 
 Alexander Dolgun
 Boris Kolesnikov
 Hugo Eberlein
 Bernt Ivar Eidsvig, Catholic Bishop of Oslo
 Rashid Khan Gaplanov, Education and Finance Minister of Azerbaijan Democratic Republic
 Yevgenia Ginzburg
 Nikolai Glushkov
 Chingiz Ildyrym, Azerbaijani Bolshevik and statesman
 Ekaterina Kalinina
 Vladimir Kirpichnikov
 Eston Kohver
 Zoya Krakhmalnikova, Soviet Christian dissident
 Platon Lebedev
 Eduard Limonov
 Alexander Litvinenko
 Vil Mirzayanov
 Levon Mirzoyan
 Osip Piatnitsky
 Leonid Razvozzhayev
 Ian Rokotov
 Mathias Rust, 18-year-old West German who landed a Cessna 172 airplane near Red Square.
 Valery Sablin
 Natan Sharansky
 Sergei Skripal
 Andrei Sinyavsky
 Aleksandr Solzhenitsyn
 Igor Sutyagin
 , French journalist and supporter of compliance with the Helsinki Agreement
 Nadezhda Ulanovskaya, wife of Alexander Ulanovsky
 Raoul Wallenberg
 Khalil Rza Uluturk, Azerbaijani poet.
 Lina Prokofiev, wife of Sergei Prokofiev
 Helmuth Weidling, German Army general
 Paul Whelan, American arrested in Moscow for espionage (citizen of the United States, Canada, United Kingdom and Ireland).

 Denys Prokopenko Redis, Ukrainian Army Lieutenant Colonel, Commander of Azov Regiment
 Svyatoslav Palamar Kalyna, Ukrainian Army Captain, Deputy Commander of Azov Regiment
 Serhii Volynskyi Volyna, Ukrainian Army Major, Commander of 36th Marine Infantry Brigade

See also
Qincheng Prison

References

External links
 Lefortovo prison  – Includes hand-drawn floorplan
 "New Times Loom for Fabled Lefortovo Prison", The St. Petersburg Times, June 7, 2005

Buildings and structures in Moscow
Buildings and structures built in the Soviet Union
KGB
NKVD
Prisons in Russia
Prisons in the Soviet Union